Rhaegal may refer to:

 Rhaegal (Game of Thrones), one of the three dragons hatched by Daenerys Targaryen in the Game of Thrones franchise
 Rhaegal, one of the three dragons hatched by Daenerys Targaryen in the A Song of Ice and Fire books by G.R.R. Martin
 Sabrewing Rhaegal, a proposed American unmanned cargo aircraft developed by Californian Sabrewing Aircraft
 Pseudocalotes rhaegal, Rhaegal's false garden lizard, a species of agamid lizard, found in Malaysia